Sewickley Hills is a borough in Allegheny County, Pennsylvania, United States. The population was 689 at the 2020 census.

Education
Sewickley Hills is served by the Quaker Valley School District.

Government and politics

Councilmembers
 [2017-2019] Multiparty-3 (Phillips, Guttendorf, Hajnas), Republicans-1(Faulkner), Unknowns-1(Lepone)

Geography
Sewickley Hills is located at  (40.560548, -80.119960).

Surrounding neighborhoods
Sewickley Hills has five borders, including Bell Acres to the north, Franklin Park to the northeast, Ohio Township to the east, Aleppo Township to the south, and Sewickley Heights to the west.

Demographics

At the 2000 census there were 652 people, 225 households, and 186 families living in the borough. The population density was 261.8 people per square mile (101.1/km2). There were 231 housing units at an average density of 92.8 per square mile (35.8/km2).  The racial makeup of the borough was 94.33% White, 2.45% African American, 1.84% Asian, 0.77% from other races, and 0.61% from two or more races. Hispanic or Latino of any race were 1.69%.

There were 225 households, 40.0% had children under the age of 18 living with them, 77.3% were married couples living together, 3.6% had a female householder with no husband present, and 16.9% were non-families. 13.8% of households were made up of individuals, and 6.2% were one person aged 65 or older. The average household size was 2.90 and the average family size was 3.23.

The age distribution was 28.8% under the age of 18, 4.3% from 18 to 24, 25.2% from 25 to 44, 32.8% from 45 to 64, and 8.9% 65 or older. The median age was 40 years. For every 100 females there were 103.1 males. For every 100 females age 18 and over, there were 98.3 males.

The median household income was $79,466 and the median family income  was $92,102. Males had a median income of $58,125 versus $31,875 for females. The per capita income for the borough was $38,681. About 3.6% of families and 3.5% of the population were below the poverty line, including 2.2% of those under age 18 and 2.9% of those age 65 or over.

References

Populated places established in 1958
Boroughs in Allegheny County, Pennsylvania
1958 establishments in Pennsylvania